Sardar Shahnawaz Khan Khushk, is a village in Kandiaro Taluka of Naushahro Feroze District, Sindh, Pakistan.

Kandiaro Taluka